Kawilorot Suriyawong was the sixth Ruler of Chiang Mai.  He was the son of Kawila, the first Ruler of Chiang Mai.  He was born on c.1799, ruled Chiang Mai on 1854, and died on 1870.

In 1860, he created a great bell for Wat Phra That Doi Suthep and renovated several temples.  He had made a lot of contribution to Buddhism in Lanna Kingdom. He married Princess Usa and had two daughters: Thip Keson and Ubon Wanna.

Thipkraisorn was married to King Inthawichayanon of Chiang Mai, his successor.  Their daughter was Princess Dara Rasmi.

References

Rulers of Chiang Mai
Chet Ton dynasty
19th-century Thai monarchs